James Michael Muro, Jr. (born March 14, 1966) is an American BAFTA Award-nominated cinematographer and director. He is known primarily for his Steadicam work. In the late 1980s and 1990s, he was James Cameron's Steadicam operator of choice, working on the Cameron-directed films The Abyss, Terminator 2: Judgment Day, True Lies, and Titanic. Throughout his career, he has been credited as Jimmy Muro, James Muro, Jim Muro, and J. Michael Muro.

Muro also did Steadicam and B-camera operating on Kevin Costner's Academy Award-winning epic Dances with Wolves, contributing to cinematographer Dean Semler's win of the Academy Award for Best Cinematography. He has also worked on Costner's Open Range, making his debut as a director of photography.

In 1987, Muro made his directorial debut with the horror film Street Trash. He has directed several episodes of the Warner Bros. Television series Southland.

Selected filmography as cinematographer

Personal life
Muro's father was the owner of Statewide Auto Parts, a now-defunct junkyard located at 1256 Grand Street, Brooklyn, New York City.

References

External links
 

1966 births
Living people
People from Queens, New York
Film directors from New York City
American cinematographers